La Grande-Fosse is a commune in the Vosges department in Grand Est in northeastern France.

Points of interest
Arboretum du Col du Las

See also
Communes of the Vosges department

References

External links

Official site

Grandefosse